Amīr Sūrī was the king of the Ghurid dynasty from the 9th-century to the 10th-century. According to some legends, He was a descendant of the Ghurid king Amir Banji, whose rule was legitimized by the Abbasid caliph Harun al-Rashid. Amir Suri is known to have fought the Saffarid ruler Ya'qub ibn al-Layth al-Saffar, who managed to conquer much of Khurasan except Ghur. Amir Suri was later succeeded by his son Muhammad ibn Suri. Although Amir Suri bore an Arabic title and his son had an Islamic name, they were both Buddhists and were considered pagans by the surrounding Muslim people, and it was only during the reign of Muhammad's son Abu Ali ibn Muhammad that the Ghurid dynasty became an Islamic dynasty.

The Ghurids originated from the Ghuristan mountains, and were divided into numerous tribes, among which, the Shansabani tribe had the most authority. 

Abu'l-Fadl Bayhaqi, the famous historian of the Ghaznavid era, wrote on page 117 in his book Tarikh-i Bayhaqi: "Sultan Mas'ud left for Ghuristan and sent his learned companion with two people from Ghor as interpreters between this person and the people of that region."

References

Sources

 

9th-century Iranian people
10th-century Iranian people
Iranian Buddhists
Ghurid dynasty
Buddhist monarchs
10th-century deaths
Year of birth missing
10th-century rulers in Asia
9th-century rulers in Asia